Bajathuru  is a village in the southern state of Karnataka, India. It is located in the Puttur taluk of Dakshina Kannada district in Karnataka.

Demographics
 India census, Bajathuru had a population of 5409 with 2705 males and 2704 females.

See also
 Dakshina Kannada
 Districts of Karnataka
 Mangalore
 Uppinangadi

References

External links
 http://dk.nic.in/

Villages in Dakshina Kannada district